The Manikya dynasty was the ruling house of the Twipra Kingdom and later the princely Tripura State, what is now the Indian state of Tripura. Ruling since the early 15th century, the dynasty at its height controlled a large swathe of the north-east of the Indian subcontinent. After coming under British influence, in 1761 they transitioned from feudal monarchs into rulers of a princely state, though the Manikyas maintain control of the region until 1949, when it ascended in union with India.

History
Tracing a descent from the mythological Lunar dynasty, the Rajmala royal chronicle records an unbroken line of 144 (likely legendary) monarchs of Tripura up to the ascension of one Ratna Fa, who is stated to have become the first Manikya after being granted the cognomen by the Sultan of Bengal. However, it is now believed that the Rajmala had been mistaken in the genealogy and chronology of the initial Manikya rulers. Numismatic evidence suggests that the first historical Manikya was in fact Maha Manikya, a Tripuri chief who founded the kingdom after establishing dominance over neighbouring tribes in the early 1400s. This monarch then took the title "Manikya" in honour of a historic victory over Bengal, with the name being inherited by his descendants.

Maha Manikya's early successors achieved considerable military success, conquering territory in Bengal, Assam and Burma. Tripura reached its zenith in the 16th century under such prominent kings as Dhanya Manikya and Vijaya Manikya II, with its lands stretching from the Garo Hills in the north to the Bay of Bengal in the south. As monarchs of a Hindu kingdom, the Manikyas developed a rivalry with the successive Muslim rulers of Bengal, coming into conflict with Sultans, governors and Nawabs before being brought under Mughal suzerainty in the early 17th century. As Mughal power waned, the antagonism with Bengal re-erupted, which drove the Manikyas to first approach the British for aid. In 1761, Tripura succumbed to British influence, becoming a princely protectorate, though control of the region remained under the Manikya dynasty.

In 1870, Bir Chandra Manikya ascended the throne and began a series of political reforms to his kingdom, modelling his government on the British system. A lover of the culture of Bengal, Bengali was adopted by the court under his rule and he developed a friendship with the celebrated poet, Rabindranath Tagore. After Tripura was briefly incorporated into the province of Eastern Bengal and Assam at the beginning of the 20th century, the last Manikya monarch, Maharaja Bir Bikram Kishore, chose to come under the jurisdiction of the predominantly Hindu Dominion of India in 1947. The final ascension of Tripura into the modern Indian nation was signed by his widow, Kanchan Prava Devi, in place of the minor Kirit Bikram Kishore, bringing to an end five centuries of Manikya rule.

List of rulers

Family tree

References

Bibliography

History of Tripura
Dynasties of India